Tussock may refer to:

Tussock grass, a group of species in the family Poaceae
Floating island
 Lymantriinae, called tussock moths or tussocks

See also 

 Hassock (disambiguation)
 Hummock (disambiguation)
 Hillock